Chah Ziarat Daniyal (also Romanized as Chāh Zīārat Dānīyāl) is a village in Golashkerd Rural District, in the Central District of Faryab County, Kerman Province, Iran. At the 2006 census, its population was 116, in 26 families.

References 

Populated places in Faryab County